The Downtown Philadelphia Historic District is a designated area within the city limits of Philadelphia, Mississippi in Neshoba County. It was listed in the National Register of Historic Places in 2005, and is loosely bounded by the streets of Myrtle, Peachtree, Walnut, and Pecan. The district features a number of commercial buildings built in the Classical and Mission/Spanish Revival architectural styles.

References

Historic districts on the National Register of Historic Places in Mississippi
National Register of Historic Places in Neshoba County, Mississippi